Mordellistena gounellei is a beetle in the genus Mordellistena of the family Mordellidae. It was described in 1941 by Maurice Pic.

References

gounellei
Beetles described in 1941